CIPC-FM is a French language contemporary hit radio station that operates at 99.1 MHz (FM). Licensed to Port-Cartier, Quebec, Canada. it serves the Sept-Îles area. The station is owned by Radio Port-Cartier Inc.

The station originally began broadcasting in 1976 on the AM dial at 710 kHz, until it received CRTC approval in 1993 to move to its current FM frequency.

The station is authorised to broadcast at a maximum ERP (effective radiated power) of 45,016 watts; on June 8, 2010, the CRTC denied CIPC-FM's application to increase their maximum ERP to 100,000 watts, following opposition from competing stations CKCN-FM in Sept-Îles and CHLC-FM in Baie-Comeau.

References

External links
Listen Live
 

Ipc
Ipc
Ipc
Radio stations established in 1976
1976 establishments in Quebec